"Ridin'" is a song by American rapper Chamillionaire featuring fellow American rapper Krayzie Bone of Bone Thugs-n-Harmony, released on February 27, 2006, as the second single from his debut studio album The Sound of Revenge (2005). Produced by hip hop producer Play-N-Skillz, the song's lyrics discuss racial profiling and police brutality, in addition to the stereotyping of African-Americans driving a vehicle with drugs and other contraband on the inside (riding dirty).

Music video
The music video shows police officers abusing their powers, though Chamillionaire does admit to various crimes, including DWI and prostitution. He juxtaposes police actions with wrestling scenes to show how the police allegedly treat suspects. The music video, filmed in Houston, features appearances from Tom Lister Jr., Wish Bone, Layzie Bone, Play-N-Skillz, Chingo Bling, OG Ron C, Big Tuck, and Chamillionaire's younger brother Rasaq.

Reception
The song topped the Billboard Hot 100 in the U.S. for two weeks and peaked at number two in the United Kingdom, behind Shakira when it was released.  At the 49th Annual Grammy Awards, "Ridin'" won Best Rap Performance by a Duo or Group and received a nomination for Best Rap Song. It was awarded the last Best Rap Video at the MTV Video Music Awards in 2006. The song ranked number three on Rolling Stone 100 Best Songs of 2006 and number 6 on BET's Top 100 Music Videos Of 2006. It was the best-selling ringtone in 2006, with 3.2 million sales, certified by the RIAA as the first multi-platinum Mastertone artist in history.

Chart performance
"Ridin'" debuted on the Billboard Hot 100 at number 88 the week of February 25, 2006. Eight weeks later, it moved eight spots from number 12 to number 4 the week of April 29, 2006 and stayed there for two weeks. It peaked at number one and stayed there for two weeks. This gave both artists their first Hot 100 number-one hit in their career. It stayed on the chart for thirty-one weeks.  In New Zealand, the song debuted at number 3, then moved to number 2 the next week where it peaked at and stayed for seven consecutive weeks.

Track listing 
UK 12-inch
 "Ridin'" (album version)
 "Ridin'" (UK remix) (featuring Sway)
 "Ridin'" (instrumental)

Charts

Weekly charts

Year-end charts

Certifications

See also
Driving while black
"White & Nerdy", a parody of the song by "Weird Al" Yankovic.
List of Billboard Hot 100 number-one singles of the 2000s
List of Billboard Rhythmic number-one songs of the 2000s

References

2005 songs
2006 singles
Chamillionaire songs
Krayzie Bone songs
Songs written by Chamillionaire
Billboard Hot 100 number-one singles
Internet memes
Songs written by Krayzie Bone
Song recordings produced by Play-N-Skillz
Universal Records singles
Songs about prison
Songs about police brutality
Songs against racism and xenophobia